Macrocossus is a genus of moths in the family Cossidae.

Species
 Macrocossus caducus H.K. Clench, 1959
 Macrocossus coelebs H.K. Clench, 1959
 Macrocossus grebennikovi Yakovlev, 2013
 Macrocossus sidamo (Rougeot, 1977)
 Macrocossus toluminus (Druce, 1887)

References

 , 1959: Notes on African Cossidae. Veröffentlichungen der Zoologischen Staatssammlung München, 6: 3-27. Full article: .
 , 1990: A Phylogenetic study on Cossidae (Lepidoptera: Ditrysia) based on external adult morphology. Zoologische Verhandelingen 263: 1-295. Full article: .
 , 2013: The Cossidae (Lepidoptera) of Malawi with descriptions of two new species. Zootaxa, 3709 (4): 371-393. Abstract:

External links
Natural History Museum Lepidoptera generic names catalog

Cossinae